This is a list of airports in Syria, sorted by location.

Syria, officially the Syrian Arab Republic, is a country in Western Asia, bordering Lebanon and the Mediterranean Sea to the west, Turkey to the north, Iraq to the east, Jordan to the south, and Israel to the southwest. Syria's capital city is Damascus.



Airports 
Airport names shown in bold have scheduled passenger service on commercial airlines.

Public airports

Closed airports

See also 

 Al-Dumayr Military Airport
 List of airports by ICAO code: O#OS - Syria
 List of Syrian Air Force bases
 List of Syrian Air Force squadrons
 Military of Syria
 Syrian Air Force
 Transport in Syria
 Wikipedia: WikiProject Aviation/Airline destination lists: Asia#Syria

References

External links 

 
 
 Airports in Syria. World Aero Data.
 Syrian Arab Air Force. Global Security.
 Syrian Arab Air Force. Scramble.

 
Syria
Syria
Airports
Airports